The Q-class was a class of 24 trams built by the Melbourne & Metropolitan Tramways Board (MMTB). They were built as part of the MMTB's plan to quickly increase the size of its fleet at its Holden Street Workshops. Twenty were rebuilt for use on all night services and in this role they travelled across the network.

References

Melbourne tram vehicles
600 V DC multiple units